ZISD may refer to:

Zavalla Independent School District
Zephyr Independent School District